The Olkolo or Koko-olkola' are an Indigenous Australian people of central and eastern Cape York Peninsula in northern Queensland.  According to Norman Tindale, they are to be distinguished from the Kokangol, higher up on the Alice River watershed.

Language
Olkola belongs to the Kunjen branch of the Southwestern Paman languages, as is mutually intelligible with Uw Oykangand, one of the other dialects of that group.

Country
The Olkolo are the traditional owners of some  extending from the Middle Coleman River, as far south as Crosbie River., and including the western margins of the Quinkan region.

Lifestyle and ecology
The Olkolo are one of the Kawadji, or sandbeach people, who harvested the maritime resources available to them as coastal dwellers opposite the Coral Sea. Traditionally, the rhythm of their foraging depended on the climatic changes over two seasons, the dry season that arrived with the south-east trade winds, blowing from April through to November, followed by the northwest monsoon season, beginning in late November/early December. During the dry season, they would occasionally move inland to cull vegetables and timber, but otherwise spent the major part of the year camped on the shores.

History
By 1889, Olkolo people could be found in camps south of their traditional grounds, in the Coen area. One descendant, Willy Long of Laura recalled several decades later a massacre, from which his parents survived, which took place by 40 troopers under Sub-Inspector Urquhart from the Musgrave police station. The ambushed Olkolo fled and sought refuge in swamps, where they were gunned down, in one of 5 such massacres that took place in 1889.

Alternative names
 Koko Olkol, Koko Olkolo, Koko-olkol.
 Ol'kol., Olkulo
 Koka-ollugul.
 Ulkulu.
 Wulgulu.
 Olgolo.
 Olcoola.

Notes

Citations

Sources

Aboriginal peoples of Queensland